Niimi (written: 新見, 新美 or 新実) is a Japanese surname. Notable people with the surname include:

 (1887–1993), Imperial Japanese Navy admiral
 (1836–1863), a commander of the Shinsengumi
 (1913–1943), Japanese writer
 (born 1974), Japanese taekwondo practitioner
 (born 1964), Aum Shinrikyo member
 (born 1949), Japanese handball player

Japanese-language surnames